gene ID :57510
Exportin-5 (XPO5) is a protein that, in humans, is encoded by the XPO5 gene. In eukaryotic cells, the primary purpose of XPO5 is to export pre-microRNA (also known as pre-miRNA) out of the nucleus and into the cytoplasm, for further processing by the Dicer enzyme. Once in the cytoplasm, the microRNA (also known as miRNA) can act as a gene silencer by regulating translation of mRNA. Although XPO5 is primarily involved in the transport of pre-miRNA, it has also been reported to transport tRNA.

Much research on XPO5 is ongoing. miRNA is a prominent research topic due to its potential use as a therapeutic, with several miRNA-based drugs already in use.

Mechanism

Binding to pre-miRNA 

After RanGTP binds to XPO5, the XPO5-RanGTP complex forms a U-like structure to hold the pre-miRNA. The XPO5-RanGTP complex recognizes pre-miRNA by its two-nucleotide 3’ overhang—a sequence consisting of two bases at the 3’ end of the pre-miRNA that are not paired with other bases. This motif is unique to pre-miRNA, and by recognizing it XPO5 ensures specificity for transporting only pre-miRNA. On its own, pre-miRNA is in a “closed” conformation, with the 3’ overhang flipped up toward the RNA minor groove. However, upon binding to XPO5, the 3’ overhang is flipped downwards away from the rest of the pre-miRNA molecule into an “open” conformation. This helps the backbone phosphates of these two nucleotides form hydrogen bonds with many XPO5 residues, allowing XPO5 to recognize the RNA as pre-miRNA. Because these interactions involve only the RNA phosphate backbone, they are nonspecific and allow XPO5 to recognize and transport any pre-miRNA. The rest of the pre-miRNA stem binds to XPO5 via interactions between the negatively-charged phosphate backbone and several positively-charged interior XPO5 residues.

XPO5 Ternary Complex Transport Mechanism 
The combined structure of XPO5, RanGTP, and pre-miRNA is known as the ternary complex. Once the ternary complex is formed, it diffuses through a nuclear pore complex into the cytoplasm, transporting pre-miRNA into the cytoplasm in the process. Once in the cytoplasm, RanGAP hydrolyzes GTP to GDP, causing a conformational change that releases the pre-miRNA into the cytoplasm.

Export out of the Nucleus 
It has been suggested, through evidence provided by contour maps of water density, that the interior of XPO5 is hydrophilic, while the exterior of XPO5 is hydrophobic. Therefore, this enhances the binding capabilities of XPO5 to the nuclear pore complex, allowing for transport of the ternary complex out of the nucleus.

Additional interactions 

XPO5 has been shown to interact with ILF3 and Ran.

Potential oncogenic role 
Recent evidence has shown higher levels of XPO5 in prostate cancer cell lines in-vitro, suggesting that altered XPO5 expression levels may have a role in cancer development. Suppressing XPO5 has also been found to be therapeutic in-vitro. It has also been shown to function as an oncogene in colorectal cancer.

References

Further reading 

 
 
 
 
 
 
 

MicroRNA